Carlo Randanini (died 1884) was an Italian painter, in oil and watercolor, mainly of genre subjects, including costume genre.

Biography
He was a resident of Rome, where he was born and completed his studies. In 1881 at Milan, he displayed a canvas depicting Un mendicante, studio dal vero. In 1883 at Rome, he exhibited another similar subject, and in 1884 at Turin: Al passeggio che fu bene accolto. He died in Turin that same year.

References

Date of birth unknown
1884 deaths
19th-century Italian painters
Italian male painters
Italian costume genre painters
Painters from Rome
Italian watercolourists
19th-century Italian male artists